Jan van Koningsveld (born 1969 in Emden) is a mental calculator. He is the champion of Extracting Square Roots of 2004 and 2008 as well as the champion of Calendar Calculation of 2008 at the Mental Calculation World Cups. In addition, he finished second in the overall rankings of 2004, 2006 and 2008.

During the first Memoriad 2008, the Olympiad for Mental Calculation and Memory held in İstanbul, Turkey, Jan van Koningsveld won the gold medals in the categories Multiplication as well as Calendar Calculation. After the competition he was also able to even the world record in the category Calendar Calculation by calculating 56 days of the week (range 1600–2100) in 1 minute.

Jan van Koningsveld also held the world record for multiplying two five-digit numbers. He solved ten tasks correctly in 3:06 minutes on 25 November 2005. That record was broken by Marc Jornet Sanz during world record attempts at the 2010 Mental Calculation World Cup

References

External links 
 http://memoriad.com/ MEMORIAD
 http://www.recordholders.org/en/list/memory.html  Memory and Mental Calculation World Records 
 http://www.recordholders.org/en/events/worldcup/index.html Mental Calculation World Cup Site

1969 births
Living people
Mental calculators
People from Emden